Massamba is a Congolese surname that may refer to

Alphonse Massamba-Débat (1921–1977), Congolese Progressive Party politician
David Massamba (born 1992), Gabonese football midfielder 
Kilasu Massamba (1950–2020), Congolese football midfielder
Rigobert Massamba Musungu, major general in the Air Force of the Democratic Republic of the Congo
Thomas Massamba (born 1985), Swedish-Congolese basketball player 
Kongo-language surnames

Surnames of Congolese origin